Trischistognatha limatalis is a moth in the family Crambidae. It is found in Costa Rica.

The wingspan is about 31 mm. The forewings are silky brown, tinged with dull red. The hindwings are silky brown, with darker veins.

References

Moths described in 1912
Evergestinae